Blackfield & Langley Football Club is a football club based in the village of Blackfield, near Southampton, England. Their local rivals are Fawley and Hythe & Dibden.

History
The club was established in 1935. During World War II they played in the Hythe & District League, and following the war the club joined the Southampton Junior League. After winning Division One in 1945–46, they moved up to the West Division of the Southampton League. In their first season in the league they won the West Division and the Southampton Senior Cup. In 1949 the club joined Division Three East of the Hampshire League. Despite winning the division in 1951–52, they were not promoted, and were Division Three West runners-up the following season. The club were runners-up again in 1954–55 and were placed in Division Three following league restructuring at the end of the season.

Blackfield & Langley were Division Three runners-up in 1955–56 and this time were promoted to Division Two. However, after finishing second-from-bottom of the division in 
1959–60, the club were relegated back to Division Three. League restructuring in 1968 saw them moved into Division Three West, before further reorganisation in 1971 led to the club becoming members of Division Four. A third-place finish in 1974–75 resulted in promotion to Division Three, but they were relegated back to Division Four after finishing bottom of the table in 1978–79. When Division Four was abolished in 1980, the club were moved up to Division Three.

The 1981–82 season saw Blackfield & Langley finish as runners-up in Division Three, earning promotion to Division One. After missing out on promotion to Division One on goal difference in 1983–84, they went on to win the Division Two title in 1984–85 and were promoted to the league's top division. They were Division One runners-up in 1988–89 and again in 1991–92 and 1993–94. They went on to win Division One and the Southampton Senior Cup in 1997–98, but were unable to take promotion due to their ground not meeting the Wessex League requirements. However, after upgrade work was complete, a third-place finish in the renamed Premier Division in 1999–2000 was enough to secure promotion. When the Wessex League gained extra divisions in 2004, the club were relegated to the new Division Two, having finished second-from-bottom of the league in 2003–04. Division Two was subsequently renamed Division One in 2006.

Blackfield & Langley were Division One runners-up in 2008–09, earning promotion to the Premier Division. In 2012–13 the club won the Premier Division, but did not apply for promotion to the Southern League due to the cost of upgrading their ground. They won the Hampshire FA's Russell Cotes Cup in 2014–15, beating Horndean 2–0 in the final. The club were Premier Division champions in 2017–18, earning promotion to Division One South of the Southern League. The 2018–19 season saw the club win the Division One South title, earning promotion to the Premier Division South.

Ground
The club moved to the Gang Warily Recreation Ground after it was identified as a suitable site for a ground that could be upgraded to Wessex League standard. Located next to the Fawley Refinery, it currently has a capacity of 2,500, of which 180 is seated.

Honours 
Southern League
Division One South champions 2018–19
Wessex League
Premier Division champions 2012–13, 2017–18
Hampshire League
Premier Division champions 1997–98 
Division Two champions 1984–85
Division Three West champions 1951–52
Southampton League
West Division champions 1946–47
Southampton Junior League
Division One champions 1945–46
Southampton Senior Cup
 Winners 1946–47, 1997–98
Russell Cotes Cup
 Winners 2014–15

Records
Best FA Cup performance: Fourth qualifying round, 2012–13
Best FA Trophy performance: Second qualifying round, 2019–20
Best FA Vase performance: Fourth round, 2012–13, 2013–14
Record attendance: 295 Vs. Dartford FA Cup Second Qualifying Round 2019/20 (05/10/2019)

See also
Blackfield & Langley F.C. players
Blackfield & Langley F.C. managers

References

External links

 
Football clubs in England
Football clubs in Hampshire
Association football clubs established in 1935
1935 establishments in England
New Forest District
Southampton Saturday Football League
Hampshire League
Wessex Football League
Southern Football League clubs